The swallow-tailed moth (Ourapteryx sambucaria) is a moth of the family Geometridae. The species was first described by Carl Linnaeus in his 1758 10th edition of Systema Naturae. It is a common species across Europe and the Near East.

Description
This is a large (wingspan 50–62 mm), impressive moth, remarkably butterfly-like. All parts of the adult are bright white to pale yellow marked with faint buffish fascia. The species gets its common name from pointed projections on the termen of the hindwing with brownish spots at their base. It flies at night in June and July  and is attracted to light, sometimes in large numbers. Prout gives an account of the variations.  The  egg is orange, with about 16 longitudinal keels and between them transverse lineations. The larva
is grey-brown, the colouring arranged in a succession of scarcely noticeable longitudinal lines.

The brown, twig-like larva feeds on a variety of trees and shrubs including elder, hawthorn, honeysuckle and ivy. The species overwinters as a larva.

The flight season refers to the British Isles. This may vary in other parts of the range.

References

 Chinery, Michael Collins Guide to the Insects of Britain and Western Europe 1986 (Reprinted 1991)
 Skinner, Bernard Colour Identification Guide to Moths of the British Isles 1984

External links

 Swallow-tailed moth on UKMoths
 Lepiforum e.V.

Ourapterygini
Moths described in 1758
Geometrid moths of Great Britain
Moths of Asia
Moths of Europe
Taxa named by Carl Linnaeus